Carlos Pereira Berto Júnior (born 4 March 1983 in Rio Tinto, Paraíba), or simply Carlinhos Paraíba, is a Brazilian midfielder who currently plays for Anapolina.

Career
In December 2009 São Paulo signed him from Coritiba. On July 6, 2012,he was selected member of the special charity match for 2011 Tōhoku earthquake and tsunami as J.League All Star.

Honours
 Coritiba
Paraná State League: 2008

Career statistics
Updated to 23 February 2018.

References

External links

1983 births
Living people
Brazilian footballers
Santa Cruz Futebol Clube players
Coritiba Foot Ball Club players
São Paulo FC players
Omiya Ardija players
Júbilo Iwata players
Tokushima Vortis players
Associação Atlética Anapolina players
Campeonato Brasileiro Série A players
J1 League players
J2 League players
Expatriate footballers in Japan
Brazilian expatriate footballers
Brazilian expatriate sportspeople in Japan
Association football midfielders